Gloria Romero may refer to:
 
Gloria Romero (actress) (born 1933), Filipino film and television actress
Gloria Romero (politician) (born 1955), former member of the California State legislature

See also
Romero (disambiguation)